Max Mirnyi and Horia Tecău were the defending champions, but Mirnyi chose not to participate. Tecău played alongside Jean-Julien Rojer and successfully defended the title, defeating Santiago González and Scott Lipsky in the final, 6–3, 7–6(7–3).

Seeds

Draw

Draw

References
 Main Draw

Topshelf Openandnbsp;- Doubles
2014 Doubles